The Ruins of Athens (Die Ruinen von Athen), Op. 113, is a set of incidental music pieces written in 1811 by Ludwig van Beethoven. The music was written to accompany the play of the same name by August von Kotzebue, for the dedication of the new  in Pest, Hungary.

Perhaps the best-known music from The Ruins of Athens is the Turkish March, a theme that has claimed a place in popular culture. Beethoven had used this material before in his Six Variations on an Original Theme, Op. 76 (1809).

In 1822 the play was revived for the reopening of Vienna's Theater in der Josefstadt with a revised libretto by Carl Meisl, for which Beethoven wrote a new overture, now known as The Consecration of the House, Op. 124, and added a chorus "Wo sich die Pulse" (WoO 98).

The music for The Ruins of Athens was reworked in 1924 by Richard Strauss and Hugo von Hofmannsthal. Another revival with a revision of the text by Johannes Urzidil was conducted by Alexander von Zemlinsky at Prague's Neues Deutsches Theater in 1926.

Instrumentation
The incidental music is scored for these instruments:

Woodwinds
1 piccolo
2 flutes
2 oboes
2 clarinets in B, A and C
2 bassoons
1 contrabassoon
Brass
4 horns
2 trumpets
3 trombones (alto, tenor, and bass)

Percussion
timpani
triangle
cymbals
bass drum
castanets
Strings
violins I, II
violas
cellos
contrabasses

Action of the play
The goddess Athena, awakening from a thousand year sleep (No. 2), overhears a Greek couple lamenting foreign occupation (Duet, No. 3). She is deeply distressed at the ruined state of her city, a part of the Ottoman Empire (Nos. 4 & 5). Led by the herald Hermes, Athena joins Emperor Franz II at the opening of the theatre in Pest, where they assist at a triumph of the muses Thalia and Melpomene. Between their two busts, Zeus erects another of Franz, and Athena crowns it. The Festspiel ends with a chorus pledging renewed ancient Hungarian loyalty.

Movements 
The work consists of an overture and eight movements.

Arrangements 

In 1846 Franz Liszt composed a Capriccio alla turca sur des motifs de Beethoven (Caprice in the Turkish style on motifs of Beethoven), S.388, based on themes from The Ruins of Athens, mostly the Turkish March. In 1852 he also composed a Fantasie über Motiven aus Beethovens Ruinen von Athen (Fantasia on themes from Beethoven's 'Ruins of Athens'), for piano and orchestra (S.122), and also made versions for piano solo (S.389) and two pianos (S.649).

Use in popular culture 

In Latin America, the Turkish March was modified by Jean-Jacques Perrey and later used as the opening theme for the Mexican TV comedy El Chavo del Ocho.

In several videos documenting footage of the Warhammer 40,000 video games, the song has had a popular reaction and become a recurring theme among the fans.

The March is often found as a demonstration tune on electronic keyboards and musical toys, possibly because of its strong percussive sound.

The Duet and the Dervish Chorus were the background music for several scenes in an Australian film version of Shakespeare's Timon of Athens.

References

External links 
 
 , performed by Boston Civic Symphony, Taichi Fukumura conducting (2014)

Overtures
Incidental music
Compositions by Ludwig van Beethoven
Works about the Greek War of Independence
1811 compositions
1822 compositions
Stefan Zweig Collection